Spondylurus is a genus of lizards in the family Scincidae. The genus Spondylurus, vernacularly known as the Antillean four-lined skinks, is a neotropical skink taxon including many species.

Description
Species in the genus Spondylurus are characterized by four (occasionally three to six) dark dorsolateral stripes. This characteristic is known to fade in older individuals, and colors when preserved shift from tans and browns to greens and blues, often causing confusion as to the true color in life.

Conservation status
Many of the species of Spondylurus are extinct or endangered, resulting from invasive predators such as the mongoose.

Geographic range
The genus Spondylurus is distributed throughout the West Indies including the Caicos Islands, Jamaica, Hispaniola, Puerto Rico, and the Lesser Antilles.

Species list
These 17 species are recognized, of which 7 are considered "possibly extinct":
Spondylurus anegadae  – Anegada skink (possibly extinct)
Spondylurus caicosae  – Caicos Islands skink
Spondylurus culebrae  – Culebra skink
Spondylurus fulgidus  – Jamaican skink
Spondylurus haitiae   – Hispaniolan four-lined skink (possibly extinct)
Spondylurus lineolatus  – Hispaniolan ten-lined skink (possibly extinct)
Spondylurus macleani  – Carrot Rock skink
Spondylurus magnacruzae  – greater Saint Croix skink (possibly extinct)
Spondylurus martinae  – Saint Martin skink (possibly extinct)
Spondylurus monae  – Mona skink
Spondylurus monitae  – Monito skink (possibly extinct)
Spondylurus nitidus  – Puerto Rican skink
Spondylurus powelli  – Anguilla Bank skink
Spondylurus semitaeniatus  – Lesser Virgin Islands skink
Spondylurus sloanii  – Virgin Islands bronze skink
Spondylurus spilonotus  – Greater Virgin Islands skink (possibly extinct)
Spondylurus turksae  – Turks Islands skink

Nota bene: A binomial authority in parentheses indicates that the species was originally described in a genus other than Spondylurus.

References

Further reading
Fitzinger LI (1826). Neue Classification der Reptilien nach ihren natürlichen Verwandtschaften. Nebst einer Verwandtschafts-tafel und einem Verzeichnisse der Reptilien-Sammlung des K. K. zoologischen Museum's zu Wien. Vienna: J.G. Heubner. five unnumbered + 67 pp. + one plate. (Spondylurus, new genus, p. 23). (in German).

 
Lizard genera
Taxa named by Leopold Fitzinger